The Lambda Literary Award for LGBT Graphic Novel is an annual literary award, presented by the Lambda Literary Foundation, to a graphic novel with LGBT themes. As the award is presented based on themes in the work, not the sexuality or gender of the writer, non-LGBT individuals may be nominated for or win the award.

The award is presented to "[b]ook-length works of fiction or non-fiction that use a combination of words and sequential art to convey a narrative ..., including novels, graphic memoirs and short story or comics collections by the same author/team."

Lambda Literary is one of few organizations that has recognized comics and graphic novels since the 1980s. From 2014 to 2019, the award was named the Lambda Literary Award for LGBT Graphic Novel but in 2020, it changed to the Lambda Literary Award for Comics.

Winners and nominees

References 

Graphic Novel
Awards established in 2014
English-language literary awards
Lists of LGBT-related award winners and nominees
LGBT-related graphic novels